Queanbeyan City was a local government area located in south eastern New South Wales, Australia. The former area is located adjacent to Canberra and the Australian Capital Territory, the Queanbeyan River, the Molonglo River, the Kings Highway and the Sydney-Canberra railway.

On 12 May 2016 the Minister for Local Government announced dissolution of Queanbeyan City with immediate effect. Together with the Palerang Council the combined council areas were merged to establish the Queanbeyan-Palerang Regional Council.

The last mayor of the Queanbeyan City Council was Tim Overall, an independent politician.

Cities, towns and localities 
The Queanbeyan City Council area included the suburbs and villages of:

 Carwoola
 Crestwood
 Environa
 Googong
 Greenleigh
 Jerrabomberra
 Karabar
 Queanbeyan East
 Queanbeyan West
 Queanbeyan
 The Ridgeway
 Royalla
 Tralee

In 1998 Queanbeyan Council applied to have the localities of Letchworth, Larmer, Dodsworth and De Salis recognised as suburbs and these names were assigned by the Geographical Names Board of New South Wales. A more recent Council has had these names withdrawn.

Council

Composition and election method 
Until its dissolution, the Queanbeyan City Council was composed of ten Councillors, including the mayor, for a fixed four-year term of office. The mayor was directly elected while the nine other councillors were elected proportionally as one entire ward. , the makeup of the last council, including the mayor, was as follows:

The last Council, elected in 2012 and dissolved in 2016, in order of election, was:

Past Mayors of Queanbeyan

Amalgamation
A 2015 review of local government boundaries recommended that the Queanbeyan City Council merge with adjoining councils. The NSW Government considered two options. The alternative, proposed by Palerang Council on 29 January 2016, was for an amalgamation of the whole of Palerang with Queanbeyan Council. On 12 May 2016 the Minister for Local Government announced dissolution of Queanbeyan City with immediate effect. Together with the Palerang Council the combined council areas were merged to establish the Queanbeyan-Palerang Regional Council.

References 

Queanbeyan
Queanbeyan
Queanbeyan